Major-General Eugene Raymond  (born 1923) was a South African military commander.  A medical doctor, he joined the South African Army's medical corps in 1952, and was appointed Surgeon-General at Defence Headquarters in 1960.  When the medical services were centralised in 1968 he became the chief of the new organisation.  He retired from military service in 1969.

Awards and decorations

See also
List of South African military chiefs
South African Medical Service

References

1923 births
Possibly living people
South African generals
White South African people